The University of Maine Press is a university press that is part of the University of Maine. It is a Division of the Raymond H. Fogler Library. According to the Press, "the diverse cultural heritage of Northern New England, Quebec, and the Maritimes is the Press’s central interest. The Press publishes books in science, the arts, and the humanities, reflecting the educational mission of the University of Maine".

See also

 List of English-language book publishing companies
 List of university presses

References

External links
 University of Maine Press

Press
Maine, University of
Companies based in Penobscot County, Maine
Orono, Maine